WUHT (107.7 FM, "Hot 107.7") is an urban adult contemporary radio station that serves the Birmingham, Alabama, area.  The station is also the flagship station of the UAB Blazers Radio Network which had previously been heard on sister station WWMM.  Owned by Cumulus Media, the station has studios in Homewood and its transmitter is atop Red Mountain.

History
The first station to broadcast from 107.7 in Birmingham was WENN-FM, a simulcast of the popular AM station at 1320 with the same call letters.  WENN was the first FM station in Birmingham to target African-American listeners, playing what was then called “soul” music; the station had no FM competition until 1996.  When the AM changed formats and call letters in 1983, WENN-FM was well established as Birmingham’s leading station for what is now called urban contemporary music.

In 1998, new owners of the 107.7 frequency moved the programming and call letters of WENN to 105.9 FM and moved the alternative music format and WRAX call letters to 107.7.  Known on the air as "107.7 the X", WRAX became one of the highest rated alternative music/modern rock stations in the country.  The station was successful, even though it broadcast from a tower atop Miles Mountain in Palmerdale, Alabama, some 15 miles northeast of downtown Birmingham.  The majority of Birmingham’s other FM stations broadcast from towers atop Red Mountain, which overlooks the city.

In 2005, Citadel Broadcasting purchased several stations in nearby Tuscaloosa, including alternative music WANZ, whose signal covered Birmingham.  Not wanting to own two stations with the same format in the same market, the WRAX call letters were moved to 100.5 FM.  On March 31, 2005, "The X" changed frequencies again, moving to 100.5 and becoming known on the air as "The X @ 100.5".  On the same day, WUHT "Hot 107.7" debuted, branding itself as "Birmingham’s New #1 for R & B Hits".  The station now broadcasts at slightly reduced power from an antenna atop Birmingham’s Red Mountain.  Its musical presentation places it squarely between Summit Media's stations, urban contemporary WBHJ (95.7 Jamz) and adult urban WBHK (98.7 Kiss FM).  WUHT carries two nationally syndicated shows:  Steve Harvey in the Mornings and D.L. Hughley in the Afternoons. Citadel merged with Cumulus Media on September 16, 2011.

Translators

References

External links
Hot 107.7 WUHT official website

UHT
Urban adult contemporary radio stations in the United States
Cumulus Media radio stations
Radio stations established in 1969
1969 establishments in Alabama